Eyal Golan (born Eyal Bitton; 12 April 1971) is an Israeli singer who sings in the Mizrahi music pop fusion genre, and considered one of the most successful singers in Israel. Golan reported the highest income of all singers in Israel in 2011.

Early life
Eyal Bitton was born in Rehovot, Israel, to a family of both Sephardic Jewish (Moroccan-Jewish) and Mizrahi Jewish (Yemenite-Jewish) descent. His parents are Daniel "Dani" Bitton and Ronit (nee Jamil) and grew up in the neighborhood of Kfar Marmorek in  his hometown. When he was 4 his parents divorced and he resided with his mother's family.

Music career
Golan started performing in nightclubs at the age of 20. His first album, Lehisha ba'Laila (in Hebrew לחישה בלילה meaning Whisper in the Night) was released in 1995. In 1996, he put out another album, called BeHofa'a Haya (in Hebrew בהופעה חיה, "live show") being a live concert which included songs from famous Israeli singers such as Shlomo Artzi.

In 1996, Ze'ev Nehama and Tamir Kliski, members of the band "Ethnix", were searching for a Mizrahi singer for producing a music album. The two saw Golan in a concert in the "Chava Club" in Petah Tikva, and decided to feature Golan's vocals the album. Their collaboration lasted until 2000 resulting in three hugely successful albums: Bila'adayikh (in Hebrew בלעדייך meaning Without You) in 1997, Chayal shel Ahavah (in Hebrew חייל של אהבה meaning Soldier of Love) in 1998 and Histakli Eilay (in Hebrew הסתכלי אלי meaning Look at me) in 1999 before they parted in 2000.

Meanwhile Eyal Golan continued solo with ever-increasing success. He was managed for a long time by record producer Ishai Ben Zur, who was responsible for the success of many of Eyal's albums. However, because of financial disputes, they stopped working together.

In 2008, Golan put out the album Hoze Otah Muli (in Hebrew הוזה אותך מולי meaning Imagining you facing me) and in two months sold over 145,000 albums. Based on the immense success of the album he toured in Israel including important shows at the Caesarea Amphitheater in 2008 and 2009. He also toured internationally, remaining very popular in all countries of the Jewish Diaspora and with world music enthusiasts. Except for his debut album, all of Golan's studio albums have become platinum albums.

On 9 July 2018, singing competition, Aviv or Eyal, aired on Keshet 12. Golan, along with Aviv Geffen choose or reject competitors. If the competitor is chosen by both Geffen and Golan, the competitor chooses which famous singer will be his/her mentor.

Television: Eyal Golan Is Calling You
On 20 February 2011, Eyal Golan introduced a new reality show on Israeli Music 24 called Eyal Golan Is Calling You (in Hebrew אייל גולן קורא לך) where he is searching for the next Mizrahi music singer together with Yosi Ganj, Adi Leon and Yaron Elan.

On 12 April 2011, and in the first season finale in Haoman 17 club, Moran Mazor won the contest.

The show was renewed for a second season, and the winner in the finale broadcast on 25 March 2012, was the Arab-Israeli singer Nasreen Qadri.

Awards
In 1997, he was awarded the "Performer of the Year" award by Israeli Channel 2.

Personal life

He has been a semi-professional football player, having played with various lower-league teams.

He is good friends with Dutch-Greek singer Nikos Vertis, doing duets in Greek and Hebrew.

On 12 September 2002, Golan married the Miss Israel of 2001 Ilanit Levi. The couple's son Liam was born in 2003, and their daughter Alin was born in 2006. In October 2008 the couple divorced.

In 2010 he moved to Tel Aviv, Israel.

In 2012, Golan began dating Soviet Ukraine-born Israeli model Ruslana Rodina, but they never tied the knot. Rodina gave birth to a son, Yan, in 2014. The couple separated in April 2017.

In December 2018, Golan started dating Israeli model and Big Brother Israel participant Daniel Greenberg. In March 2020 the couple announced they were expecting a baby, fourth child for Golan and first for Greenberg. Their wedding took place on the 12th of March 2020, after being rescheduled due to COVID-19 restrictions. Golan and Greenberg welcomed a baby girl on the 29th of August 2020 named Miel (Honey in Spanish), and divorced on December 28, 2021.

Statutory rape allegations
In November 2013, Golan was arrested as part of a group of men suspected of having sex with underage girls. Golan denied the charges, but admitted that his father, Danny Biton, had brought girls to his home to have sex with him. Although the charges against Golan were later dropped for lack of evidence, the allegations caused Golan's songs to receive less radio airplay and for performances to be cancelled.

In December 2018, Golan was recognized by the Knesset, but many MKs and women's groups expressed anger that he would be honored. Protesters interrupted the event, but were removed by security before Golan performed a duet with MK Nava Boker, the chairwoman of the Knesset Caucus for Hebrew Music.

Tax evasion
In 2014 Golan pleaded guilty of evading 2.6 million NIS worth of taxes. He was sentenced to 4 months of community service and ordered to pay a fine of 75,000 NIS.

Discography

Studio albums
 1995 – Lechisha Ba'Layla – לחישה בלילה  (A Whisper in the Night)
 1997 – Biladaich – בלעדייך  (Without You)
 1998 – Chayal Shel Ahavah – חייל של אהבה  (Soldier of Love)
 1999 – Histakli Elay – הסתכלי אלי  (Look at Me)
 2001 – Tzlil Meytar – צליל מיתר (String sound)
 2002 – v'Ani Kore Lach – ואני קורא לך (And I Call You)
 2003 – Chalomot – חלומות – (Dreams)
 2005 – Metziut Acheret – מציאות אחרת (A Different Reality)
 2007 – Bishvilech Notzarti – בשבילך נוצרתי (I Was Made For You)
 2008 – Hoze Otach Muli – הוזה אותך מולי (Imagining You Facing Me)
 2009 – Ze Ani – זה אני (That's Me)
 2010 – Derech LaChayim – דרך לחיים (A Way of Life)
 2011 – Chelek Michayay – חלק מחיי  (Part of My Life)
 2012 – Nagaat Li Balev – נגעת לי בלב (You touched my heart)
 2013 – Halev Al Hashulchan – הלב על השולחן (The heart is on the table)
 2014 – Yamim Yagidu – ימים יגידו (Time will tell)
 2015 – Besof Kol Yom – בסוף כל יום (At the End of Every Day)
 2016 – Rachok Mikan – רחוק מכאן (Far away from here)
 2017 – Lo Pashut Lihiot Pashut – לא פשוט להיות פשוט (It is not simple to be simple)
 2017 – Osef Meshulash – אוסף משולש (Triple Collection)
 2018 – Nakhon Letamid – נכון לתמיד (Right forever), covers album and tribute to Zohar Argov.
 2019 – Hafokh Mehayekum – הפוך מהיקום (Upside down from the universe)
 2020 - Mikan v'Ad Hanetsach - מכאן ועד הנצח (From here to eternity)

Live albums
 1996 – BeHofa'a Haya – בהופעה חיה  (Live in Concert)
 2000 – haMofa'a haMeshoutaf: Ethnix v'Eyal Golan – המופע המשותף עם אתניקס  (The Duet Concert of Ethnix and Eyal Golan)
 2008 – Eyal Golan Baheichal Hatarbut – אייל גולן בהיכל התרבות (Eyal Golan Live at Heichal Hatarbut (also on DVD)
 2009 – Eyal Golan Caesarea (2009)
 2010 – Eyal Golan at Nokia Arena (2011)
 2011 – Eyal Golan part of my life Live the Sultan's Pool (2012)
 2012 – Eyal Golan Caesarea (You touched my heart)
 2013 – Eyal Golan Caesarea (The heart is on the table)
 2016 – ''Eyal Golan With Ma Kasur Live In Caesarea (2016)

See also
 Mizrahi Music

References

External links

 
 Eyal Golan songs with transliteration and translation

1971 births
Living people
Mizrahi singers
21st-century Israeli male singers
20th-century Israeli male singers
Israeli footballers
Israeli people of Moroccan-Jewish descent
Israeli people of Yemeni-Jewish descent
Hapoel Marmorek F.C. players
Maccabi Sha'arayim F.C. players
Beitar Kfar Saba F.C. players
Footballers from Rehovot
Association footballers not categorized by position
Music YouTubers
Israeli Mizrahi Jews
Israeli Sephardi Jews